Thomas George Thundat (born 1957) is an American scientist. He is currently the Empire Innovation Professor of Chemical & Biological Engineering at the University at Buffalo. Thundat is one of the pioneers in the field of nanosensors and a leading expert on microcantilevers.

His other academic appointments include an honorary Distinguished Professorship at the Indian Institute of Technology, Madras, a Centenary Professorship at the Indian Institute of Science, Bangalore, and a One Thousand Talents Professorship at the Shanghai Jiao Tong University, China. He also holds visiting faculty positions at the University of Tennessee in Knoxville, and the University of Burgundy in France.

Before arriving at UB, Thundat was a Canada Excellence Research Chair professor in Oilsands Molecular Engineering at the University of Alberta, and a Fellow of the National Institute for Nanotechnology (NRC-NINT) in Edmonton. Previously, he worked for many years at the Oak Ridge National Laboratory (ONRL), where he was a UT-Battelle Corporate Fellow and the director of the Nanoscale Science and Devices Group.

Education
Thundat grew up in India and trained as a physicist. He received his BSc from the University of Kerala (major in physics, double minor in mathematics and chemistry, first-class) in 1978, and his MSc from IIT Madras (first-class in physics) in 1980. He moved to the United States for graduate studies and completed his PhD in physics at SUNY Albany in 1987. Thundat's doctoral advisor was Walter Maxwell Gibson (whose doctoral advisor was Nobel Laureate Glenn T. Seaborg. Seaborg's doctoral advisor was Gilbert N. Lewis whose doctoral advisor was another Nobel Laureate Theodore William Richards).

Thundat was then a postdoctoral research scholar at Arizona State University with Atomic force microscopy pioneer Stuart Lindsay for three years before starting at Oak Ridge National Laboratory in 1990. While in grad school, he also held the prestigious research internship at Bell Labs in 1983–84.

Research
Thundat is an authority on nanomechanical sensors. He has pioneered the development of high-performance ultra-precise molecular-scale sensing, imaging and characterization systems based on microcantilevers. His work has been featured in press outlets such as Time.

He has also pioneered the development of single wire (single-contact) electricity transmission concept (2010), the development of hyphenated sensor concepts (for combining electrical, optical, and mechanical resonances) (2000), a novel class of physical, chemical, and biological sensors based on adsorption-induced force (1991), and the concept of micromechanical infrared detection & imaging technique including mechanical Infrared spectroscopy (1995).

He is the author of more than 500 peer-reviewed publications in refereed journals, about 50 book chapters, and around 50 US patents. His research articles have been cited more than 30,000 times with an h-index of almost 100.

Thundat's recent research has focused on physical, chemical, and biological detection using nanomechanical sensors as well as single-wire electrical power delivery. His other areas of expertise include the chemical physics of interfaces, biophysics, nanoscale transport phenomena and quantum confinement. Thundat's research group has developed novel high-performance sensor platforms and concepts based on atomic-scale interface engineering. His team is also working on single-contact electricity transmission — similar to what Nikola Tesla had envisioned. The concept uses high-frequency electrical standing waves to power a network of devices in quasi-wireless mode.

Honors
Thundat has received several scientific and research awards, including the U.S. Department of Energy’s Young Scientist Award, three R&D 100 Awards, the ASME Pioneer Award, the Discover Magazine Award, the Scientific American Top 50 Technology Leaders Award, the Jesse Beams Medal, Foresight Institute Nano 50 Award, and multiple national awards from the Federal Laboratory Consortium for excellence in technology transfer. Oak Ridge National Laboratory named him Inventor of the Year twice. He is also a Battelle Memorial Institute Distinguished Inventor. He serves on the editorial boards of 25 international journals.

Fellowships
Thundat has been elected Fellows of the American Physical Society (APS) (2002), the Electrochemical Society (ECS) (2008), the American Association for Advancement of Science (AAAS) (2006), the American Society of Mechanical Engineers (ASME) (2010), the SPIE (2012), the Institute of Electrical and Electronics Engineers (IEEE) (2021), the American Institute for Medical and Biological Engineering (AIMBE) (2017), the National Academy of Inventors (NAI) (2014), and the Indian National Academy of Engineering (INAE).

References

Academic staff of the University of Alberta
University at Buffalo faculty
Fellows of the American Physical Society
Fellows of the American Society of Mechanical Engineers
Fellows of SPIE
Fellow Members of the IEEE
Fellows of the American Institute for Medical and Biological Engineering
Fellows of the National Academy of Inventors
Living people
1957 births